Mario Longo (born 21 August 1964 in Naples) is a retired Italian sprinter who specialized in the 100 metres.

Biography
His personal best 100 metres time was 10.32 seconds, his personal best 200 metres time was 21.18 seconds. Both times were achieved in May 1998 in Naples. He continued his racing career in masters athletics, also achieving some excellent results and records. For example, on 9 January 2010, in Ancona, Italy, he sets the world record master, with the time of 6.97, in the M45 category.

Achievements

Masters athletics
Longo won three-time outdoor World Masters Athletics Championships.

See also
 List of European records in masters athletics
 List of Italian records in masters athletics
 Italy national relay team

References

External links
 
 Mario Longo at MastersAthletics.net

1964 births
Living people
Italian male sprinters
Athletes from Naples
Italian masters athletes
World record holders in masters athletics
European Athletics Championships medalists
World Athletics Championships athletes for Italy
Mediterranean Games gold medalists for Italy
Athletes (track and field) at the 1991 Mediterranean Games
Athletes (track and field) at the 1993 Mediterranean Games
Mediterranean Games medalists in athletics